The 1951 Auburn Tigers football team represented Auburn University in the 1951 college football season. It was the Tigers' 60th overall and 19th season as a member of the Southeastern Conference (SEC). The team was led by head coach Ralph "Shug" Jordan, in his first year, and played their home games at Cliff Hare Stadium in Auburn, Cramton Bowl in Montgomery and Ladd Memorial Stadium in Mobile, Alabama. They finished with a record of five wins and five losses (5–5 overall, 3–4 in the SEC).

Schedule

Roster
Vince Dooley

Season Summary

Vanderbilt
Auburn upset the 14-point favorite Commodores behind opportunistic defense and a bruising ground game. The Tigers recovered three fumbles in Vanderbilt territory and converted center Homer Williams rumbled for 122 yards on 29 carries. He scored the go-ahead touchdown with 6 minutes left in the 4th quarter and a 36-yard field goal from Joe Davis iced it with less than a minute left. Tailback Charles Hattaway racked up 120 yards on 24 carries and nose guard Bill Turnbeaugh made a few key defensive plays in the 4th quarter.

Wofford
Looking to erase the embarrassment of the previous year's loss to the hands of Wofford, Shug's Tigers were able to get revenge on the feisty Terriers by a 30-14 margin. The defense, led by Vince Dooley, took advantage of several Wofford mishaps, even with allowing Terrier quarterback Jack Beeler to complete 23 of 30 passes against them. Punter Dudley Spence was magnificent, pinning the visitors deep with every kick, and freshman Bobby Freeman made an impressive 79-yard touchdown jaunt to break the game open.

Florida
The Homecoming battle with Florida proved to be one of the most exciting contests of the season. The Gators struck first with a blocked punt to set up a touchdown and Auburn responded with an interception that led to an Allan Parks score just before half. With the score knotted at 7 apiece, the Tigers were forced to a 3-n-out to begin the second half. With the benefit of a 12-yard punt, the visitors promptly took advantage by engineering a three-play scoring drive. The point after sailed wide, but the Gators had amassed a 13-7 lead. The game was a seesaw affair from here out, with multiple fumbles direly costing Florida chances to put the contest away. With time dwindling in the final quarter, 137-pound Tiger defensive back Jack Creel proved to be the giant of the day by blocking a Florida punt at the Gator 29-yard line. It was big Bill Turnebaugh who corralled the pigskin to give Auburn possession. Despite the fortunate shift of momentum, the home team could only manage 5 yards on their first 3 attempts. With a minute left to play, Auburn faced a 4th down-and-5 at the 24-yard line with the game on the line. Quarterback Allan Parks took the snap from center, rolled out of the pocket, and heaved a pass to end Lee Hayley who was streaking up the sidelines. Hayley leaped for the ball and came down with it in the end zone. Joe Davis's kick was true and the Tigers held on to clip Florida, 14-13.

References

Auburn
Auburn Tigers football seasons
Auburn Tigers football